Valley Mall may refer to:

 Valley Mall (Corner Brook), a shopping mall in Corner Brook, Newfoundland and Labrador (Canada)
 Valley Mall (Hagerstown), a shopping mall in Hagerstown, Maryland, United States
 Valley Mall (Harrisonburg), a shopping mall in Harrisonburg, Virginia, United States
 Valley Mall (Yakima), a shopping mall in Yakima, Washington, United States